This list is of the Places of Scenic Beauty of Japan located within the Prefecture of Gifu.

National Places of Scenic Beauty

Prefectural Places of Scenic Beauty
As of 1 December 2020, five Places have been designated at a prefectural level.

Municipal Places of Scenic Beauty
As of 1 May 2020, fifty-seven Places have been designated at a municipal level.

Registered Places of Scenic Beauty
As of 1 January 2021, one Monument has been registered (as opposed to designated) as a Place of Scenic Beauty at a national level.

See also
 Cultural Properties of Japan
 List of parks and gardens of Gifu Prefecture
 List of Historic Sites of Japan (Gifu)

References

External links
  Cultural Properties in Gifu Prefecture

Tourist attractions in Gifu Prefecture
Places of Scenic Beauty

ja:Category:岐阜県にある国指定の名勝